Cyborg is a 1978 board wargame published by Excalibre Games.

Gameplay
Cyborg is a game in which a princess and her loyal followers fights her way to the Holy City to assume the throne while her evil aunt and her Necromancers want to throw the princess into a volcano.

Reception
W. G. Armintrout reviewed Cyborg in The Space Gamer No. 25. Armintrout commented that "Cyborg is a fun game. It is a challenging game, and the believable premise makes it easier to want to play the game over and over again. It may look like a grown-up version of Monopoly, but it is a really good game."

References

Board games introduced in 1978
Excalibre Games games